This is a list of universities in the Sakha Republic, a federal subject of the Russian Republic located in northeast Russia.

 International Institute of Management, LEU, Mirny Branch
 Arkhangelsk State Technical University
 Botanic Garden of the Irkutsk State University
 Krasnoyarsk State Agricultural University 
 Krasnoyarsk State Trade and Economic Institute 
 Siberian Federal University
 Leningrad State University, AS Pushkin, Norilsk Branch
 Krasnoyarsk State Pedagogical University, VP Astafieva, Norilsk Branch
 Norilsk Industrial Institute

References

Education in the Sakha Republic
Buildings and structures in the Sakha Republic
Russia education-related lists
Sakha
Sakha